This article documents the timeline of the COVID-19 pandemic in Afghanistan.

The COVID-19 pandemic was confirmed to have spread to Afghanistan when its index case, in Herat, was confirmed on 24 February 2020.

February 2020

23 February
 On 23 February 2020, at least three citizens of Herat who had recently returned from Qom, Iran were suspected of COVID-19 infection.
 Blood samples were sent to Kabul for further testing.

24 February 
 On 24 February, Afghanistan confirmed the first COVID-19 case involving one of the three people from Herat, a 35-year-old man, who tested positive for SARS-CoV-2.

26 February 
 On 26 February, a mask-production plant in Herat Province opened.
 The plant produces over 60,000 masks on a daily basis.
 The Ministry of Public Health announced that this would be important in slowing the spread of COVID-19 and would also help decrease the surge in prices for surgical masks.

March 2020

7 March 
 On 7 March 2020, three new cases were confirmed in Herat province.
 The new total of positive cases in Afghanistan had risen to four.

10 March 
 On 10 March, the first case was reported outside of Herat province, in Samangan province, meaning that there was a total of five cases in Afghanistan. The patient had also returned from travels in Iran.
 Up until 10 March, the Afghan government had spent $15 million in response to the outbreak and a total of 142 suspected cases had been tested, with only five being positive for COVID-19.
 Tests were sent to the Netherlands to ensure testing accuracy.
 Isolation centers were also set up across the country.
 This later rose to seven in the evening, as the Ministry of Public Health announced one new case in both Herat and Samangan provinces.

12 March 
 Pakistan identified two positive cases at the Torkham border, on 12 March.
 It was reported that one Afghan citizen with coronavirus was returned from Torkham to Afghanistan.
 The second case at the border was a Pakistani embassy employee from Kabul.
 Also during that week, 30,000 Afghan immigrants were reported to have returned from Iran, via Islam Qala port, after the outbreak in the country. This marked the highest rate of returning immigrants from Iran in over a decade.
 In March 2020, at least 150,000 Afghans returned from Iran, due to the outbreak across the country, at the Islam Qala border in Herat Province. As many as over 1000 people a day crossed the border during the month. Between March and April 2020, the number of cases surged in Herat Province to over 200 cases.
 The annual Nowruz festival in Mazar-i-Sharif was announced that it would be canceled, due to the global coronavirus pandemic.

14 March 
 On 14 March, the tenth positive case was confirmed. The Ministry of Public Health announced that Balkh province and Kapisa province had their first cases. The 23-year-old patient in Dawlatabad district, in northern Balkh, fled Bo Ali Sina Hospital after testing positive.
 The Nowruz celebrations in Balkh were canceled after the first case was reported on 14 March.
 Samangan also had their third positive case of coronavirus infection.
 The eleventh case was also announced that day, as Abdul Qayum Rahimi, the governor of Herat, reported a new positive case of the coronavirus in the province. The total cases in Herat Province rose to six.
 On 14 March, the first recorded recovery from the coronavirus in Afghanistan was a patient in Herat. Wahid Ahmad, the recovered patient (who was also the first positive case) had contracted COVID-19 from Qom and was hospitalized for two weeks.
 The first recovered COVID-19 patient in Afghanistan was announced to be in quarantine at home. The Ministry of Health later revealed on 20 March that three tests he had taken were negative and that he was allowed to end quarantine.
 Up until 14 March, the Afghan government had spent $25 million to tackle the outbreak, which includes $7 million of aid packages. Beijing (China) also announced that they would give aid to Afghanistan. A total of 50,000 testing kits have been supplied by the Afghan government. The World Bank, Asian Development Bank and World Health Organization were also providing help.
 The Ministry of Public Health revealed that they had tested 181 suspected cases. The samples of the suspected cases were from Herat, Samangan, Kapisa, Balkh, Daykundi, Parwan and Paktia provinces.
 Prime Minister of Afghanistan, Ashraf Ghani, told the public to avoid large public gatherings and to pay attention to hygiene to prevent the spread of the disease.
 The Afghanistan National Olympic Committee (ANOC) announced that all sport events were canceled after 14 March, including a Buzkashi league tournament that was being held in Kabul.
 It was announced on 14 March, that all educational institutes in the country would not open until 21 April.

15 March 
 5 new cases were reported on 15 March, which included the first case in Daykundi province.
 On 15 March, Pakistan deported 10 Afghans at Torkham (Nangarhar Province) after they developed flu-like symptoms.

16 March 
 On 16 March, 5 new positive cases were identified, meaning that the total number of cases rose to 21.
 38 patients, including one positive patient, escaped from quarantine in Herat Province by beating up workers in the hospital and breaking the windows with the help of relatives. All 38 patients were quarantined after returning from Iran.
 On 16 March, the Taliban announced that in Balkh Province, they arrested the runaway patient who tested positive for coronavirus and handed him back to health authorities.
 The Taliban also spread awareness of the coronavirus in insurgent-controlled areas of Afghanistan and supported governmental health workers.
 The Taliban also asked for Afghan returnees from Iran to be tested for COVID-19.

17 March 
 On 17 March, there were 22 confirmed cases.
 Also on that day, seven patients that escaped from Herat Hospital were returned.

18 March 
 On 18 March, the Ministry of Interior Affairs banned all large gatherings, including the closure of venues that attract large crowds such as entertainment places, sports grounds, swimming pools, fitness clubs and wedding halls.
 Also, the Ministry of Public Health said that no private labs or hospitals are allowed to undertake the checking of suspected or positive patients.
 The Ministry of Public Health announced that they intended to increase the capacity of laboratories for testing coronavirus samples in Herat and Balkh provinces.
 By 18 March, the Ministry of Public Health had registered at least 340 suspected cases of coronavirus in 23 provinces of the country since the start of the outbreak.
 The government had set up five quarantine centers in Herat and Nimruz.
 Also on that day, doctors at Blossom Hospital in Kabul launched a public awareness campaign to help the public understand how to prevent the spread of the virus.
 This included distributing over 5000 surgical masks to the public.

19 March 
 By 19 March, two new positive cases were confirmed for the first time in Baghdis and Logar provinces.

20 March 
 On 20 March, it was announced that a new laboratory in Herat is under construction, after the only laboratory in the country was in Kabul, meaning that it took longer to diagnose people who took tests.
 Wedding halls and hammams were closed and governmental departments with large numbers of employees stopped working.
 The annual Nowruz festival in Mazar-i-Sharif and across the whole of Afghanistan was not held in 2020, in order to prevent the spread of the global coronavirus pandemic.
 People were also not allowed to enter the Shrine of Hazrat Ali in Mazar-i-Sharif.

21 March 
 On 21 March, Pakistan reopened its border with Afghanistan.
 On 21 March, Afghanistan contributed $1 million to the South Asian Association for Regional Cooperation (SAARC) emergency fund to help fight COVID-19.

22 March 
 On 22 March, 10 new cases were reported, resulting in a total of 34 positive cases. New cases were reported in Ghazni, Kandahar and Zabul provinces. The two new cases in Kabul Province were both foreign diplomats.
 Khalilullah Hekmati, head of Balkh's public health directorate, announced the first official death of an Afghan due to COVID-19. The man died in Chimtal District, in Balkh Province.
 The test was confirmed positive on 22 March, but the 40-year-old patient had died three days before.
 Public Health Minister Ferozuddin Feroz urged the government to order the lockdown of the city of Herat at a press conference in Kabul.
 The spokesperson of the Health Ministry, Wahidullah Mayar, announced that 449 suspected cases had been tested across 28 provinces up until 22 March. Most suspected cases were from Herat and Kabul.
 Members of the Wolesi Jirga of Afghanistan's parliament decided to hold a general session once a week to avoid the spread of COVID-19.
 The first possible fatality of COVID-19 in Afghanistan was also announced on 22 March. The male patient was a new suspected case who displayed symptoms.
 The ministry said that the man visited a hospital in Herat because he was suffering from heart disease, but after showing signs of COVID-19 he was taken to the coronavirus treatment center in the province. An autopsy will determine whether the Herat man had contracted the coronavirus, or had died of heart disease.
 By the end of the day, the number of cases increased to 40, after six new cases were reported. These included the first two cases in Farah Province and the first case in Ghor Province. Three new cases were reported in Herat. 18 new cases in one day marked the biggest increase of positive cases in a single day.

23 March 
 On 23 March, two new cases were reported in the provinces of Logar and Samangan.
 Cordaid announced that they would distribute soap in communities, handle waste management and supply thermometers to reduce the risk of spread in Afghanistan. They also held community awareness sessions and helped to improve the referral systems of patients to health centers that have a treatment ward for COVID-19.

24 March 
 On 24 March, the Resolute Support Mission reported that 4 coalition service members had tested positive.
 Also on 24 March, a 51-year-old Afghan national in Medina, Saudi Arabia was announced as the first casualty from the coronavirus in that country. The Afghan died on 23 March.
 In Jalalabad, Nangarhar Province, the local authorities placed strict measures in the provincial capital, limiting the movement of citizens until 1 April.
 On 24 March, 32 new cases were reported, making the total number of cases 74. All of the new cases were reported in Herat.

25 March 
 On 25 March, five new positive cases were reported, as well as the second death in the country. The total climbed up to 79.
 The Afghan Government began to limit the movement of residents in Farah, Herat and Nimruz provinces, after Herat began to experience the largest number of cases in Afghanistan. In Herat, praying in mosques was suspended to prevent any possible spread of the virus. Residents of Farah and Zaranj could only go out for necessary activities.
 The figure later rose to 84 positive cases. The patient who died was a 45-year-old woman in Herat Province. The first case was also announced in Nimruz Province, where the patient had recently traveled to Iran.
 The second recovery was also reported.

26 March 
 On 26 March, two deaths were announced. The first patient was a 55-year-old who had died at Herat Hospital. The second death in the evening was confirmed to be a man who had returned to Herat from London, United Kingdom. The death toll increased to four.
 Ten new positive cases were also reported. Eight were located in Herat Province, whilst the two other cases were from Nimruz Province.
 The government announced the release of 10,000 prisoners that were aged over 55 to slow the spread of COVID-19 in the country. This also consisted of mainly women, youths and the critically ill. Based on President Ashraf Ghani's decree, the prisoners would be released over the 10 following days. The release of prisoners did not include members of Islamist militant groups.
 Also on that day, Afghan authorities extended the lockdown to Kabul, Kandahar, and Logar provinces.
 The mayor of Mazar-i-Sharif said that in addition to closing bathrooms and restaurants in the city, disinfection of public places is also taking place.

27 March 
 On 27 March, it was announced that the Afghan cabinet had approved the lockdown of the capital of Afghanistan, Kabul, from 28 March for three weeks.
 The Taliban started a public awareness campaign in Jowzjan Province. The Taliban offered safe passage to health workers that are treating coronavirus patients in Afghanistan. Furthermore, the Taliban enforced lockdowns in affected districts. People who were suspected of having COVID-19 were quarantined.
 The Health Ministry later restricted the policy on testing, testing only people with a high fever. It was reported that returnees from Iran had visited the Afghan-Japan Communicable Disease Hospital, which treats COVID-19 patients in Kabul, but were not tested. By 27 March, only 600 tests on returnees from Iran had been carried out.
 16 new cases were announced by the Ministry of Health. This included 11 new cases in Herat Province, three in Farah Province and one in Ghor Province. The third recovery in the country was also reported. The total number of cases reached 110.

28 March 
 Kabul, the Afghan capital, started a lockdown that was originally scheduled to last three weeks. On 21 May, the lockdown in Kabul was eased.
 The lockdown ensures that residents stay at home, avoiding all non-essential travel and gatherings. Residents would also need to provide valid reasons if they decide to leave their homes. All restaurants, hotels, sauna, cafes, public bathing centers, shrines, gyms, parks and other stores remain closed for 3 weeks, except for grocery stores and banks. All sport venues, shrines and other public gathering places would remain closed for the duration of lockdown in Kabul. Public transport carrying more than 5 passengers was banned. A total of 70 military teams patrolled Kabul to identify people with symptoms. The lockdown in the capital, Kabul, affected small businesses, such as local shop owners. During the lockdown in Kabul, the Ministry of Agriculture, Irrigation, and Livestock donated food for an emergency group to distribute across the province. In April 2020, Amanullah Kaliwal began to distribute 500 masks a day to the poor for free, which had been sewn at home. In less than a week, 4000 masks had been distributed to the poor in Kabul. During the lockdown, bread was given for free at bakeries across Afghanistan. 
 Large educational institutes and wedding halls were transformed into isolation centers to quarantine those who return from Iran for two weeks.
 The Health Ministry reported that in total, over 1000 tests had been carried out by 28 March.

29 March 

 By 29 March, there was a total of 120 positive cases.
 On 29 March, the Taliban launched a COVID-19 public awareness campaign in Logar Province. The Taliban offered safe passage to health workers that are treating coronavirus patients in Afghanistan. Furthermore, the Taliban enforced lockdowns in affected districts. People who were suspected of having COVID-19 were quarantined.

30 March 
 On 30 March, 25 new cases were announced, meaning that the total number of cases increased to 145.
 The first cases were recorded in Badakhshan, Nangarhar, Paktia and Sar-e Pol provinces.
 Two new recoveries were also reported.
 On 30 March, the Minister of Public Health, Ferozuddin Feroz, announced the plan to increase the capacity of health facilities in Afghanistan to 1000 tests a day by the end of the week. A center previously used to treat animals is operating as a testing facility, performing around 100 tests in 24 hours. By the end of March 2020, Afghanistan's COVID-19 testing centers had the capacity of 600 tests a day. 400 of them were in Kabul, 100 in Herat and 100 in Nangarhar.

31 March 
 On 31 March, the Ministry of Health reported four new cases from 60 tests.
 Two of the cases were reported in Kandahar, while one new case each was recorded in Daykundi and Nimruz provinces.
 22 other positive cases were later announced as positive with twelve in Herat, six in Kabul, and one new case each in Baghlan (the first in the province), Ghazni and Paktia provinces.
 By the end of March, the number of positive cases had reached 196.

April 2020

1 April 
 On 1 April, 43 new cases were announced, including 16 doctors and nurses in Herat and two further cases in the capital, Kabul. The total number of coronavirus cases rose to 239.
 Health officials reported that over 100 staff members at hospitals in Herat Province are suspected cases.
 On 1 April, the Government of Afghanistan suspended flights between Kabul and Herat.

2 April 
 On the morning of 2 April, six new cases were reported. 5 were located in Kabul Province and one was located in Daykundi Province. The total number of cases reached 245.
 In the evening, the figure reached 273, after 15 new cases were confirmed in Herat Province, as well as another death. The 13 other new cases were located in Baghlan, Kabul, Kandahar and Paktia provinces.
 The Chinese medical aid arrived on 2 April, after aid from the United Arab Emirates was received on the previous day. It was also announced on that day that Uzbekistan would provide aid for five of the northern provinces of Afghanistan.

3 April 
 The number of confirmed cases reached 281. 20 new cases were from Herat, 14 in Kabul, and one new case each in the provinces of Ghor, Nangarhar, and Nimroz.
 In the evening, the Ministry of Public Health announced 299 total cases. Herat Province had 206 cases, whilst Kabul Province had the second-highest number of cases (43). New cases were also reported in Balkh, Ghazni, Logar, and Samangan provinces. The first cases were recorded in Faryab and Kunduz provinces. The cases in Herat Province entail 144 men and 60 women, as well as four fatalities and five recoveries.
 On 3 April, the World Bank approved $100.4 million of aid to help Afghanistan.

4 April 
 The Ministry of Public Health announced that the total had reached 337. The seventh fatality in the country was also reported, whilst two more patients recovered. The 38 new cases were located in 9 provinces. Herat and Kabul had ten new cases each. Kandahar had eight, Paktia had three, Balkh and Samangan had two, whilst Kapisa and Zabul provinces had one new case each. Takhar Province reported their first case. The cases in Herat Province rose to 216, while in Kabul Province it rose to 53 cases.
 On 4 April, the Ministry of Public Health opened a testing center in Mazar-i-Sharif, Balkh Province, with the capacity of testing 30 cases a day. The capacity of the center will increase to 200 cases per day within a week. 
 Officials from Balkh Province reported that Mazar-i-Sharif is under partial lockdown as public places were closed.
 Also on that day, a 300-bed temporary hospital was opened in Herat Province, designated for COVID-19 patients.
 A local businessman had decided to convert a hotel into a hospital and treatment center for COVID-19 patients.
 The new hospital is the second center for COVID-19 patients in the province and the capacity of the new hospital will increase to 1000 beds, if needed.
 Suspected cases in Herat Province will also be admitted to the hospital.
 Around 200 doctors and nurses were hired at the hospital and received training on the COVID-19 treatment.
 Pakistan announced that the Chaman and Torkham borders will open between 6 and 9 April for stranded Afghans to return to their country at the request of the Afghan Government.
 At the Chaman and Torkham borders, over 60,000 Afghans returned from Pakistan in three days.

5 April
 On 5 April, the Ministry of Public Health confirmed 30 new cases, which brought the total number of cases to 367. Herat had 16 new cases, Kabul had six, Nimruz had three, Faryab and Kunduz both had two, and Daykundi only had one new case. 5 new recoveries were reported, meaning that the total number of recoveries in Afghanistan reached 17.
 Clerics and religious scholars enforced a fatwa on 5 April. Around 500 mosques were closed in Herat in late March 2020. The Ministry of Hajj and Religious Affairs announced restrictions on Friday prayers and other prayers in mosques across Afghanistan.

6 April 
 On 6 April, the death toll increased to 11, as a doctor from a private hospital in Kabul was reported as the eleventh fatality in the country. The Health Ministry also reported the eighteenth recovery. Out of 2737 suspected cases, only 367 had tested positive.
 However, in the evening it was reported that 27 new cases in Herat Province were recorded from 140 tests.
 21 were men, while 6 were women.
 Overall, 56 new cases were confirmed positive.
 Kabul had 12 new cases, Kandahar had 10, Balkh had 5, and Nangarhar had 2 new cases confirmed.
 The total increased to 423.
 It was reported on 6 April, that many volunteer groups and community health workers had begun awareness campaigns, such as a door-to-door campaign by a group of women in Parwan Province and a provincial campaign for Faryab Province by local officials. The Ministry of Public Health also began to spread awareness via social media and traditional media.
 By 6 April 2020, there had been 423 positive cases, 18 recoveries and 11 deaths across 22 provinces in the country.
 Herat Province had the highest number of cases at 259, followed by Kabul Province with 71 cases, and then Kandahar Province with 21 cases.

7 April 
 On 7 April, a testing facility in Kandahar opened, which also caters for the provinces of Helmand, Urozgan, and Zabul.
 On 7 April, two new cases were reported in Kandahar Province.

8 April 
 On 8 April, the 14th death and 20th recovery were announced. A doctor had died at a clinic in Kabul, which was later closed.
 The first cases were reported in Helmand and Wardak provinces.
 On 8 April, the Ministry of Public Health announced that there are only 300 ventilators in Afghanistan.

9 April 
 On 9 April, 40 new cases were reported, as well as the 15th fatality, and 32 recoveries.
 14 new cases were recorded in Nimruz, ten in Kabul, seven in Kandahar, four in Paktia, two each in Balkh and Bamyan (the first cases in the province), and a single new case in Logar Province.
 With 257 cases, four of the 14 Afghan fatalities had been reported in Herat Province. Despite this, no new cases in Herat Province were recorded on 9 April, due to a lack of testing kits.
 The Ministry revealed that the deaths recorded up until 9 April entailed four in Balkh and Herat, three in Kabul, two in Nangarhar, and one each in Daykundi and Takhar provinces.
 By 9 April, over 1,500 police officers had been deployed in Kabul.

10 April 
 On 10 April, 37 new cases were tested positive, including the first case in Parwan Province. 16 new cases were recorded in Kabul, Herat had eight, whilst Daykundi, Kandahar, Logar, Takhar all had two new cases. The Ministry of Public Health also announced that Bamiyan had a single new case.
 By 10 April, at least 20 employees at the Arg (Presidential Palace) had contracted COVID-19 in Kabul.
 Another 34 cases were announced by the Ministry of Public Health in the evening. Herat and Kabul both had eight new cases, Kandahar had five, Nimruz and Wardak had four, Balkh had two, whilst Badghis, Baghlan, and Ghor all had a single new case each.
 The total number of cases reached 555, after an increase of 71 new cases, which was the highest number of cases reported in a single day in Afghanistan.
 Three new fatalities were also reported, including two men in Kabul.
 One of the two had spread COVID-19 to 12 other people in their family.
 The men were 67 and 37 years old.

11 April 
 On 11 April, 52 new cases were recorded, meaning that the total number of cases reached 607.
 Kabul had 28 new cases, Kandahar had eight, Herat had seven, Balkh had four, Bamyan had two, whilst Helmand, Nangarhar, and Paktia all had a single new case each.
 It was announced that school lessons would be taught online via television and radio.

12 April 
 On 12 April, three new fatalities were announced by the health ministry, as the number of recoveries reached 38. 58 new cases were recorded across six provinces. Kandahar had 28 new cases, Kabul had 13, Helmand had seven, Nimruz had six, Takhar had three, and Kunduz reported a single case.
 Herat announced no new case in the province for the second time that week.
 The number of cases in Herat Province reached 280, whilst in Kabul the number of cases had risen to 146. The number of cases in Kandahar had rapidly increased to 75.
 It was announced at the new testing center in Herat, that testing was suspended for twice in a week due to a lack of kits, resulting in no new cases reported from Herat on 9 and 12 April. The new testing facility only has the capacity of 140 tests a day and has to cater for Badghis, Farah, Ghor, and Nimruz provinces.
 Meanwhile, in Balkh, a new hospital was opened in Mazar-i-Sharif, which can treat up to 200 patients. Despite this, there are only 15 ventilators. This is the sixth COVID-19 designated hospital after two in Herat and Kabul, and another one in Nangarhar. In contrast to Herat's testing capacity, the testing facility in Balkh has a capacity of 50 tests a day.
 In Kandahar Province, a 350-bed hospital is used for treating COVID-19 patients in the Aino Mena district of Kandahar.
 The lockdown measures in Kabul Province were made stricter on 12 April.
 All main highways were closed, as the lockdown was extended for a further two weeks.
 The Ministry of Interior Affairs announced that there would be consequences for anyone that violates the lockdown.
 It was announced that a group under the name Voice of the pulpit and the doctor, would launch a public awareness campaign in Kabul. The group consists of doctors and religious scholars.
 The national power company, Da Afghanistan Breshna Sherkat (DABS), asked the government for a $50 million loan after announcing that they had lost 60% of their revenue due to the outbreak.
 If the imported electricity from Uzbekistan is not paid, Afghanistan could have power cuts.

13 April 
 On 13 April, 49 new cases were recorded by the health ministry across six provinces.
 Kabul had 18 new cases, followed by Kandahar with 15, Balkh had six, Ghazni and Herat both had four, and Nangarhar reported two new positive cases.
 As the number of cases increased to 714, the 40th recovery was also announced, as well as two additional deaths, the total death toll reaching 23.

14 April 
 70 new cases were tested positive across 11 provinces. Kabul had 31 new cases, Herat had 22, Ghazni and Kandahar both had three new cases, Nangarhar, Nimruz and Wardak had two cases, whilst Baghlan and Faryab had one new case each. The first two cases were recorded in Kunar Province, as well as the first case in Urozgan Province. The number of cases in Kabul had reached 209, with 11 recoveries and six fatalities. The total number of cases in the country reached 784, with 43 recoveries and 25 deaths.
 On 14 April, a factory opened in Kabul, which is the first in Afghanistan that produces personal protective equipment (PPE).
 It was reported on 14 April that Surobi District, in Kabul Province, had 31 of Kabul's cases, which included doctors and police officers.
 On 14 April, Bayat Group, one of the largest private companies in Afghanistan, launched the Stop The Virus (STV) campaign.
 The campaign also includes the disinfection of cities.
 The group also began to distribute food in Herat.
 During Ramandan, they distributed food packages in Khost Province and Maymanah, Faryab.

15 April 
 On 15 April, 56 new cases were recorded, meaning that the number of cases increased to 840. 37 new cases were reported in Kabul. 11 new recoveries and 5 fatalities were announced by the health ministry.
 It was reported in Herat, that around 40 patients were reported to be at hospital, meaning that around 260 patients were isolated at home at their own request. The patients in isolation are still in contact with doctors.

16 April 
 On 16 April, the Ministry of Public Health announced 66 new cases from 465 tests, as well as 45 new recoveries.
 Kabul had 26 new cases, Kandahar had 15, Balkh had six, Herat and Kunduz both had five, Helmand had four, and Kunar and Nangarhar both had one case each. The first three cases were recorded in Laghman Province.
 Herat had 43 of the new recoveries, whilst Ghor and Kandahar had one new recovery each.
 The total number of cases reached 906, whilst the number of recoveries increased to 99.
 The Afghan-Japan Hospital in Kabul stopped accepting samples for COVID-19 testing for two days, due to a surge in requests, despite having the capacity to test 300 samples a day. It was reported that some people had waited for results for almost two weeks.
 By 16 April, the government had spent 27 million afs on awareness campaigns.
 In Herat Province, more than 35,000 shops and factories were closed by 16 April, leading to a loss of profits and unemployment. Economic difficulties has resulting in workers and shop owners being unable to pay rents. Construction also stopped in the province.

17 April 
 On 17 April, the health ministry recorded 27 new cases and 13 new recoveries.
 Kabul had 12 new cases, Paktia had seven, Logar had four, Herat had two, whilst Bamyan and Daykundi had one new case each.
 The lockdown in Kabul Province was extended by three weeks until 9 May.
 Balkh's testing centers announced that they needed health equipment for doctors.
 On 17 April, shopkeepers and street vendors across Kabul announced that there incomes had been affected by the lockdown. Breadwinners of families and low-wage vendors have been badly affected in poor communities of Kabul. According to the government, a future program will provide aid.
 The European Union (EU) announced that they would provide technical support and €117 million for Afghanistan.

18 April 
 On 18 April, a 65-year-old man became the sixth fatality in Balkh, as well as the 31st fatality overall in Afghanistan, as the health ministry reported that three patients had died in the past 24 hours.
 63 new cases were recorded in eight provinces, including the first case in Jowzjan Province. Kabul had 31 new cases, Balkh had 16, Kunar had six, Herat had four, and Baghlan had three. Faryab and Laghman reported one new case each. Two other fatalities were recorded that day, including the owner of a private hospital in Kabul and a surgeon in Jowzjan, as well as 15 new recoveries. The total number of recoveries reached 131, as the number of cases increased to 996.
 It was reported that there was a lack of testing kits in Balkh, which led to a stop in testing.
 It was also announced that there was a lack of RNA testing kits, but the World Health Organization (WHO) had some supplied testing kits for Afghanistan.
 An opening ceremony was held at Darul Aman Palace, where a new COVID-19 isolation and treatment center has 200 beds. Due to 30 suspected deaths in Surobi District, Kabul Province, a new treatment facility with 20 beds was built. By 18 April, the Government of Afghanistan had given $15 million to the Ministry of Public Health (MoPH), after the $100 million from the World Bank had not arrived at this point. The plan for an isolation center with 10,000 beds was announced, as well as an overall 100,000 beds across centers in Afghanistan. Up until 18 April, 5,800 samples had been tested.
 Balkh officials and volunteers announced that over 20,000 displaced people and returnees, as well as over 10,000 vulnerable families in the province, needed assistance due to the loss of jobs, low wages, and unemployment. Food supplies from Uzbekistan had not been distributed to the vulnerable families yet, despite arriving weeks earlier.

19 April 
 On 19 April, three more fatalities were recorded, with two in Kabul and one in Kandahar. 35 new cases were confirmed by the health ministry, meaning that the total number of cases reached 1,031. Kabul had 15 new cases, Laghman had nine, Herat has six, Kunar had four, and Nangarhar reported a single new case. The number of recoveries increased to 135. By 19 April, 110 health workers (90 men and 20 women) had tested positive and four had died.
 The number of COVID-19 cases in the Arg had doubled to 40.

20 April 
 On 20 April, 66 new cases were confirmed from 311 tests. Kabul reported 52 new cases, Laghman had five, Baghlan and Nangarhar had four, and Paktia had one new case. 15 new recoveries were also recorded. The number of cases reached 1,092, as the number of recoveries reached 150.
 By 20 April, over 6,000 tests had been carried out. 5,000 new testing kits arrived in Afghanistan. It was also reported that 11 of the 16 RNA testing kits had been used.

21 April 
 On 21 April, 51 new cases were confirmed by the health ministry. Kabul had 28 new cases, Kandahar had 22, Nangarhar had six, Nimruz had five, Helmand and Kapisa had four, Herat and Kunar had three, Ghazni and Zabul had two, whilst Bamyan, Farah, Laghman, Paktia and Parwan all recorded a single new case. The number of fatalities reached 40, as the number of recoveries reached 166.
 By 21 April, around 5,300 tests had been carried out.
 On 21 April, the Ministry of Interior Affairs started an investigation on an active restaurant (Seven Stars) in Taimani, during the lockdown in Kabul. The owner of the restaurant attacked a reported for TOLOnews.

22 April 
 On 22 April, two new fatalities were announced, as well as 14 new recoveries. The health ministry confirmed 106 new cases, which is the highest number of cases reported in a single day in Afghanistan. Kandahar had 53 new cases, Herat had 21, Kunduz had 15, Jowzjan had 10, Kabul and Nangarhar had six, Nimruz had five, Kapisa and Logar had four, Kunar and Paktia had three, Ghazni had two, whilst Parwan and Takhar recorded a single new case. Paktika and Panjshir provinces recorded their first two cases.
 The restaurant in Taimani was closed and the owner was prosecuted.

23 April 
 On 23 April, 63 new cases were confirmed. Out of 95 cases (including some from the previous evening), Kandahar had 53 new cases, Balkh had 21, Kabul had 11, Takhar had 10, Nangarhar and Panjshir had five in Nangarhar, Herat had three, Farah had two, whilst Daykundi, Laghman, Nimruz and Parwan recorded a single case each. Five recoveries in Herat and four recoveries in Kandahar were announced by the health ministry. The total number of recovered cases reached 188. A new fatality was recorded in Kandahar, as the total number of deaths in Afghanistan increased to 43. A suspected patient in Kabul died before he was tested positive. In the evening, Balkh announced 21 new cases and a single new case in Nimruz.
 A second shipment of medical equipment arrived from China.
 It was reported that in western Kabul medical workers had begun volunteering by distributing food and equipment (such as gloves) to poor families. They also provided counseling advice and disinfected roads.
 On 23 April, the investigation on Shakila Ibrahim, the owner of Seven Stars, was sent to the Attorney General's Office of Afghanistan. The Afghan Journalist Safety Committee advised the government to take the investigation seriously.

24 April 
 112 new cases were reported by the health ministry. Out of 133 cases (with some from the previous evening), Herat had 25, Balkh had 21, Kandahar had 20, Kabul and Paktia had 16, Nimruz and Samangan had seven, Kapisa, Logar and Zabul had three, Bamyan, Ghor and Urozgan had two, whilst Baghlan, Helmand, Parwan and Wardak all recorded a single new case. Four new fatalities were also reported over 24 hours. One of them was Assadullah Fazli, who had previously served as the head of the Kunar public health directorate. The number of recoveries had reached 206.
 By 24 April, 7,425 samples had been tested.
 The health ministry announced that the problem with the RNA testing kits had been resolved.

25 April 
 The number of fatalities increased to 50. Out of three new fatalities, two were in Ghazni and one was in Herat. 68 of 242 tests were positive. Ghazni had 13, Paktia had 11, Paktika had nine, Balkh had eight, Badghis and Kabul had six, Herat and Nangarhar had four, Khost and Laghman had three, and one case was recorded in Baghlan. The number of recoveries had reached 207.
 By 25 April, 8,090 tests had been carried out.

26 April 
 172 new cases were tested positive from 600 samples across 18 provinces. Balkh had 34, Herat had 33, Kabul had 27, Kandahar had 21, Baghlan and Paktia had eight, Kunduz had seven, Ghor and Sar e-Pol had five, Faryab, Nimruz and Samangan had four, Khost, Laghman and Nangarhar had three, Helmand had two, whilst Paktika and Panjshir recorded a single new case each. Seven new fatalities were confirmed by the health ministry. The number of recoveries reached 220.
 By 26 April, there were testing centers in 22 police districts in Kabul run by volunteer health workers.
 8,694 tests had been carried out.

27 April 
 125 new cases were tested positive from 361 samples across 18 provinces. Herat had 21, Kabul had 15, Balkh had 10, Logar had nine, Jowzjan had eight, Lagman, Paktia and Panjshir had seven, Ghazni and Takhar had six, Nangarhar had five, Helmand, Kunar and Wardak had two, whilst Badakhshan, Badghis and Kapisa recorded a single new case each. One new fatality was reported. The number of recoveries reached 228.
 The government approved the purchase of 500 new ventilators, as well as a $4 million funding for the construction and renovation of COVID-19 facilities. $164 million was spent altogether, which also included testing kits.
 By 27 April, 9,000 tests had been carried out.

28 April 
 On 28 April, 111 new cases were tested positive. The number of confirmed cases reached 1,939. The number of fatalities reached 60, as the number of recoveries reached 260.

29 April 
 On 29 April, 232 cases were tested positive from 581 samples across 23 provinces, which is the highest number of cases reported in a single day in Afghanistan. The number of confirmed cases reached 2,171. Kandahar had 45, Balkh had 41, Kabul had 20, Ghazni had 12, Logar and Paktia had 10, Panjshir and Samangan had nine, Takhar had eight, Kunduz had seven, Baghlan and Nangarhar had five, Badghis and Wardak had four, Laghman had three, Paktika and Parwan had two, whist Faryab and Sar e-Pol recorded a single new case each. Four new fatalities were reported, with two in Herat and one in Kabul. By 29 April, 10,022 tests had been carried out. The number of recoveries reached 260.
 PCR testing started at the Afghan-Japan hospital in Kabul.

30 April 
 On 30 April, 164 new cases were tested positive. The number of cases increased to 2,335. 50 new recoveries and four new fatalities were announced by the health ministry. The number of recoveries reached 310.
 228 health workers had been infected.
 By 30 April, 10,593 tests had been carried out.

May 2020

1 May 
 On 1 May, the health ministry reported 179 new cases from 591 samples across 12 provinces, bringing the total to 2,469. From 164 recent cases, the health ministry announced that Kabul had 75, Herat had 23, Balkh had 18, Jowzjan had 16, Kandahar had 15, Ghazni had 10, Baghlan had seven, Logar had five, Takhar had four, Ghor had three, Zabul had two, and Helmand had one new case. The number of recoveries reached 331 as the death toll reached 72. 249 health workers had been infected.
 By 1 May, 11,068 tests had been carried out.

2 May 
 On 2 May, the health ministry announced 235 new cases. Kabul had 65 new cases, Kandahar had 54, Herat had 19, Panjshir had 14, Takhar had 13, Nangarhar had 12, Ghor and Samangan had 10, Baghlan had nine, Wardak had seven, Badghis, Bamyan and Laghman had five, Sar e-Pol had three, Kunar and Parwan had two, whilst Farah and Helmand recorded a single new case each. The number of recoveries reached 345. 13 new fatalities were recorded across Afghanistan, meaning that the death toll reached 85.

3 May 
 On 3 May, the health ministry announced 190 new cases. Paktia had 41, Herat had 30, Kandahar had 25, Kabul had 24, Balkh had 17, Nangarhar had 13, Laghman had 11, Farah had nine, Sar e-Pol had six, Kunar had five, Zabul had three, Paktika had two, whilst Helmand, Khost, Nimruz and Urozgan recorded a single new case each. Five new fatalities were recorded, which included two in Paktia. Herat, Kabul and Wardak reported a single new fatality each. The death toll reached 90 as the number of recoveries reached 397.

4 May 
 On 4 May, the health ministry announced 330 new cases, which is the highest number of cases reported in a single day in Afghanistan. Herat had 59, Kabul had 45, Kandahar had 41, Balkh had  38, Paktia had 26, Nangarhar had 13, Panjshir had 12, Laghman and Takhar had 11, Logar and Samangan had 10, Paktika had nine, Parwan had seven, Faryab had six, Ghazni, Kunar and Kunduz had five, Kapisa and Wardak had four, Badakhshan and Zabul had three, Farah had two, whilst Helmand recorded a single new case. By 4 May, 13,076 tests had been carried out. Five new fatalities were recorded, which included two in Logar. Baghlan, Laghman and Nangarhar reported a single new fatality each. The death toll reached 95 as the number of recoveries reached 421.

5 May 
 On 5 May, the health ministry announced 31 new recoveries and nine fatalities. From 168 new cases, Kabul had 67, Herat had 32, Kandahar had 14, Nangarhar had 11, Faryab and Laghman had nine, Logar had eight, Baghlan, Balkh and Paktia had four, Kunar had two, whilst Helmand, Samangan and Sar e-Pol recorded a single new case each. The first case was recorded in Nuristan Province, the last province to report a COVID-19 case. By 5 May, 13,777 tests had been carried out. The number of recoveries reached 458 as the death toll reached 104.

6 May

7 May 
 On 7 May, it was reported that the health minister, Dr. Ferozuddin Feroz, had tested positive and was isolating at home.
 The health ministry reported 215 new cases. Herat had 57, Kabul had 50, Balkh had 31, Kandahar had 17, Jowzjan had 11, Paktia had nine, Ghor had eight, Kunar had seven, Logar had six, Nangarhar had five, Farhab had four, Paktika and Zabul had three, whilst Khost and Laghman recorded two cases each. Four new recoveries were recorded in Herat. Two fatalities were reported. One person in Nangarhar was a 30-year-old man who was suffering from heart disease and the other was a 50-year-old man in Kandahar who was suffering from asthma.
 Kam Air announced that during the lockdown it loses over £6 million a week as all 119 local and international flights were stopped. Aviation companies requested tax exemptions from the Ministry of Finance. Tourist companies were also affected.
 The Ministry of Education launched an online website for school students in Dari and Pashto. Acting Minister Mirwais Balkhi announced that all coursework at home would be graded if exams were not held.
 By 7 May, 15,000 tests had been carried out.

8 May 
 On 8 May, the health ministry reported 253 new cases from 520 samples. Herat had 71, Balkh had 43, Nangarhar had 39, Takhar had 24, Jowzjan had 22, Paktia had 16, Kunduz and Laghman had 11, Ghazni had eight, Kabul had four, whilst Bamyan, Kunar, Nuristan and Panjshir recorded a single new case each. 29 new recoveries and six new fatalities were reported. The death toll reached 115, as the total recoveries reached 502.
 On 8 May, the health ministry announced that there was 3,230 available beds across all 34 provinces. By 8 May, 15,560 tests had been carried out.
 Bayat Group and Afghan Wireless Communication Company (AWCC) disinfected areas of Kabul with the health ministry.

9 May 
 On 9 May, the health ministry reported 361 new cases. Kabul had 117, Herat had 59, Balkh had 31, Kandahar had 26, Baghlan had 21, Farah had 18, Laghman had 12, Samangan and Wardak had 11, Panjshir had nine, Nangarhar and Parwan had eight, Kunar had seven, Helman had five, Badakhshan and Ghazni had four, Jowzjan and Sar e-Pol had three, Paktika had two, whilst Paktia and Zabul recorded a single new case each. Six prisoners had been infected in Nangarhar. Four new fatalities were reported, bringing the death toll to 120. 65 patients were discharged after fully recovering.
 Six protesters were killed in Chaghcharan, Ghor Province while protesting against the unfair food aid distribution that was given by Qatar during the pandemic.
 The protesters attacked security forces and government property. Three of the protesters were shot by police and tanks were later placed in the city. The Afghanistan Journalists' Centre announced that local volunteer radio presenter Ahmadkhan Nawid was killed. Two policemen were also killed. The Ministry of Interior Affairs announced that ten police officers and nine civilians were injured.
 Amnesty International launched an investigation on the use of police.

10 May 
 On 10 May, the health ministry reported 285 new cases. Kabul had 161, Kandahar had 30, Badghis and Logar had 18, Kunar and Nangarhar had 16, Herat had seven, Ghor and Kunduz had five, Helmand and Parwan had three, Nuristan had two, whilst Wardak reported a single new case. 161 people tested positive from 365 tests in Kabul. Deputy Minister of Health, Wahid Majrooh, announced that only a certain number of patients had been admitted to the center at Darul Aman Palace for various reasons, which included security issues. Majrooh also announced that the threat of the COVID-19 pandemic in Afghanistan was still high. Two new fatalities were recorded. One was in Kandahar and the other was in Nangarhar. 16 new recoveries were recorded.
 Balkh eased the lockdown in Mazar-i-Sharif.

11 May 

 On 11 May, the health ministry reported 281 new cases, bringing the total number of cases to 4,963. Kabul had 84, Balkh had 33, Wardak had 28, Badghis and Nangarhar had 20, Takhar had 14, Kandahar had 13, Herat and Panjshir had 12, Helmand had seven, Kunduz, Sar e-Pol and Zabul had five, Jowzjan and Parwan had four, Badakhshan and Kapisa had three, Ghor had two, whilst Baghlan, Faryab, Nimroz, Paktia, Samangan and Urozgan recorded a single new case each. Five new fatalities were recorded. The death toll reached 127, as the number of recoveries increased to 610. By 11 May, 18,098 tests had been carried out.

12 May 

 On 12 May, the health ministry reported 259 new cases from 619 tests, bringing the total to 5,226. Balkh had 49, Kandahar had 29, Kabul had 27, Takhar had 25, Nangarhar had 23, Herat had 22, Kunar and Parwan had 10, Badghis had eight, Jowzjan had seven, Baghlan, Logar and Wardak had six, Daykundi and Panjshir had five, Faryab had four, Kunduz, Nimroz and Zabul had three, Bamyan, Farah and Helmand had two, whilst Ghor and Laghman recorded a single new case each. Five new fatalities were recorded. The death toll reached 132, as the number of recoveries reached 648. By 12 May, 18,724 tests had been carried out.

13 May 

 On 13 May, the health ministry reported 413 new cases from 1,008 tests, bringing the total to 5,639. Kabul had 188 cases from 441 tests, Ghazni had 35, Kandahar had 34, Nangarhar had 30, Baghlan had 25, Balkh had 24, Samangan had 20, Paktia had 15, Wardak had nine, Logar had seven, Nimroz, Laghman and Sar e-Pol had five, Paktika had four, Zabul had three, Panjshir had two, whilst Faryab and Nuristan recorded a single new case each. Four new fatalities were recorded. The death toll reached 136, as the number of recoveries reached 691. By 13 May, 19,732 tests had been carried out.

14 May 

 On 14 May, the health ministry reported 414 new cases from 1,122 tests, bringing the total to 6,053. Kabul had 162, Herat had 132, Nangarhar had 26, Samangan had 19, Kandahar had 13, Paktia had 12, Jowzjan had nine, Laghman had eight, Faryab had six, Kunduz and Zabul had five, Paktika had four, Badakhshan and Khost had three, Ghazni and Kapisa had two, whilst Daykundi, Helmand and Sar e-Pol recorded a single new case each. 17 new fatalities were recorded. The death toll reached 153, as the number of recoveries increased to 745. The health ministry announced that the testing capacity had been increased to 1,100 test a day. By 14 May, 20,854 tests had been carried out.

15 May 

 On 15 May, the health ministry reported 349 new cases, bringing the total to 6,402. Kabul had 126, Paktia had 56, Nangarhar had 37, Balkh had 31, Herat had 29, Baghlan had 11, Kandahar and Logar had 10, Laghman had Sar e-Pol had eight, Takhar had seven, Badghis and Jowzjan had five, Kunduz had three, whilst Bamyan, Panjshir and Wardak recorded a single new case each. 15 new fatalities and 32 new recoveries were recorded. The death toll reached 168, as the number of recoveries reached 745. By 15 May, 21,969 tests had been carried out.

16 May 
 On 16 May, 262 new positive cases were announced, bringing the total positive cases to 6,664. Kabul had 60, Herat had 57, Samangan had 22, Logar had 1 O4, Balkh and Khost had 11, Paktia, Parwan, Takhar and Wardak had 10, Badghis, Faryab, Kapisa and Paktika had eight, whilst Baghlan recorded six cases. Two fatalities and seven recoveries were recorded. The death toll reached 169, as the number of recoveries reached 784. By 16 May, 22,639 tests had been carried out.
Doctors at Pul-e-Charki prison and the Kabul detention center announced that 50 prisoners and staff had tested positive from 600 suspected cases. They announced that the 250-bed quarantine center would be expanded to 1,000 beds if there were more cases.
 Bayat Group distributed food packages to needy families in Daykundi.

17 May 

 On 17 May, 408 new positive cases were announced, bringing the total to 7,072. Kabul had 162, Herat had 95, Balkh had 31, Takhar had 20, Khost had 19, Parwan had 18, Paktia had 15, Wardak had eight, Logar had seven, Baghlan had six, Daykundi and Ghor had five, Kunar and Paktika had four, Kunduz and Panjshir had three, Kapisa had two, whilst Laghman recorded a single new case. Three fatalities and 23 recoveries were recorded. The death toll reached 173, as the number of recoveries increased to 801. By 17 May, 23,497 tests had been carried out.

18 May 
 On 18 May, 581 new positive cases were announced, bringing the total to 7,653. Kabul had 165, Nangarhar had 134, Balkh had 55, Herat had 38, Laghman had 30, Paktia had 29, Samangan had 23, Ghazni had 21,Kunar had 16, Sar-e Pol had 15, Takhar had 12, Badghis had 13, Panjshir had nine, Baghlan had five, Kunduz and Parwan had four, Paktika had three, Khost had two, whilst Badakhshan, Daykundi and Wardak recorded a single new case each. Five fatalities and 45 recoveries were reported. The death toll reached 178, as the number of recoveries reached 850. By 18 May, 24,697 tests had been carried out.
 Bayat Group distributed food to needy families in Badakhshan.

19 May 
 On 19 May, 492 new positive cases were announced, bringing the total to 8,145. Kabul had 262, Herat had 59, Balkh had 33, Baghlan had 30, Takhar had 28, Jawzjan had 14, Nangarhar and Paktia had 10, Panjshir and Parwan had nine, Kunar had seven, Logar had six, Kapisa had five, Farah and Sar-e Pol had four, whilst Ghazni recorded two new cases. 10 fatalities and 80 recoveries were recorded. The death toll reached 187, as the number of recoveries reached 930. By 19 May, 25,700 tests had been carried out.
On 19 May, Bayat Group and AWCC disinfected more areas of Kabul and the Children's Health Hospital.

20 May 

 On 20 May, 531 new positive cases were announced, bringing the total to 8,676. Kabul had 274, Herat had 69, Balkh had 55, Nangarhar had 35, Wardak had 26, Sar-e Pol had 15, Parwan had 13, Khost and Paktika had 12, Paktia had seven, Laghman had five, Faryab had three, Farah and Jowzjan had two, whilst Badghis recorded a single new case each. Six fatalities and eight recoveries were reported. The death toll reached 938, as the number of recoveries reached 938. By 20 May, 26,707 tests had been carried out.

21 May 

 On 21 May, 542 new positive cases were announced, bringing the total to 9,216. Kabul had 316, Herat had 47, Nangarhar had 24, Baghlan and Takhar had 23, Balkh had 19, Kunar had 18, Farah and Laghman had 15, Ghazni had 13, Panjshir had eight, Daykundi and Paktia had five, Kunduz had four, Wardak had three, Nuristan had two, whilst Kapisa and Logar recorded a single new case each. 12 fatalities and 58 recoveries were reported. The death toll reached 205, as the number of recoveries reached 993. By 21 May, 27,889 tests had been carried out.
 On 21 May, the lockdown in Kabul was eased.

22 May 

 On 22 May, 782 new positive cases were announced, bringing the total to 9,998. Kabul had 377, Herat had 150, Balkh had 49, Ghazni had 47, Nangarhar had 32, Paktia had 28, Samangan had 21, Baghlan, Logar and Paktika had 12, Kapisa had 11, Kunar had 10, Laghman had six, Badghis, Farah and Ghor had four, whilst Takhar recorded a single new case. 11 fatalities and 44 recoveries were reported. The death toll reached 216, as the number of recoveries reached 1,040. By 22 May, 29,417 tests had been carried out.
 On 22 May, the Hajj Ministry told people that they should avoid gatherings on Eid-al-Fitr if they have COVID-19 symptoms.
President Ashraf Ghani announced that Kabul would ease restrictions on business and travel after Eid al-Fitr holidays.

25 May 

 On 25 May, 658 new positive cases were announced, bringing the total to 11,831. Kabul had 237, Herat had 86, Balkh had 77, Baghlan had 59, Badghis and Farah had 52, Nangarhar had 27, Bamyan had 11, Logar had seven, Kapisa had six, Sar-e Pol had four, whilst Samangan and Takhar recorded a single new case each. One new fatality was recorded, taking the death toll to 220. 31 new recoveries were recorded in Balkh. The number of recoveries increased to 1,128.n By 25 May, 32,870 tests had been carried out.

26 May 

 On 26 May, 625 new positive cases were announced, bringing the total to 12,456. Kabul had 360, Herat had 108, Balkh had 50, Parwan had 26, Takhar had 24, Kunar had 14, Baghlan and Panjshir has nine, Ghor and Laghman had eight, Nangarhar had five, Bamyan had two, whilst Bamyan and Farah recorded a single new case each. The death toll reached 227, as the number of recoveries reached 1,138. By 26 May, 33,864 tests had been carried out.

27 May 

 On 27 May, 580 new positive cases were announced, bringing the total to 13,036. Kabul had 322, Herat had 139, Panjshir had 27, Balkh had 22, Farah had 21, Paktia had 20, whilst Faryab recorded 15 new cases. The death toll reached 235, as the number of recoveries reached 1,209. By 27 May, 34,936 tests had been carried out. The health ministry announced that it was running out of medical supplies.

28 May 

 On 28 May, 623 new positive cases were announced from 985 tests, bringing the total to 13,659. Kabul had 271, Herat had 179, Nangarhar had 67, Balkh had 23, Khost had 18, Laghman had 13, Badakhshan and Parwan had 10, whilst Bamyan, Daykundi, Kunar, Logar, Paktia, Paktika and Takhar recorded less than 10 new cases. 11 fatalities were reported. Herat had seven, Khost had two, whilst Balkh and Kabul reported a single fatality each. 50 new recoveries were announced. Paktika had 21, Kabul had 15, Farah and Herat had five, Khost had three, whilst Nuristan recorded a single new recovery. By 28 May, 35,921 tests had been carried out.

29 May 

 On 29 May, 866 new positive cases were announced from 1,425 tests. 16 provinces reported new cases. Kabul had 411 from 707 tests, whilst Faryab recorded 2 new cases. 44 recoveries and three fatalities were recorded. Farah, Logar and Paktia recorded a single fatality each. Herat had 17 recoveries, Badghis had 16, Kabul had six, whilst Kunduz recorded five new recoveries. By 29 May, 37,348 tests had been carried out.

30 May 

 On 30 May, 680 new positive cases were announced from 1,112 tests. Kabul reported 371 new cases from 624 tests. Herat had 111, Balkh had 75, Samangan had 33, Takhar had 22, Nangarhar had 21, Laghman had 18, Baghlan had 11, whilst Bamyan, Daykundi, Kunar, Logar and Parwan recorded less than 10 new cases. 25 recoveries and eight fatalities were recorded. The death toll reached 257, as the number of recoveries reached 1,328. By 30 May, 38,460 tests had been carried out.

31 May 

 On 31 May, 545 new positive cases were announced from 1,168 tests, bringing the total to 15,750. Herat had 117, Paktia had 92, Kabul had 66, Nangarhar had 50, Samangan had 48, Farah had 36, Sar-e Pol had 22, Bamyan had 20, Logar had 17, Badakhshan, Ghor and Takhar had 14, Faryab and Wardak had 12, whilst Badghis, Balkh, Kunar and Laghman recorded less than 10 cases. 100 recoveries and eight fatalities were recorded. The number of new cases in Kabul decreased for the first time in two weeks. By 31 May, 39,628 tests had been carried out.
On 31  May, President Ashraf Ghani appointed Ahmad Jawad Osmani as the acting minister of public health, replacing Ferozuddin Feroz.

June 2020

1 June 

 On 1 June, 759 new positive cases were announced, bringing the total to 16,509. Kabul had 266, Herat had 212, Paktia had 66, Balkh had 39, Nangarhar had 34, Baghlan had 27, Khost had 25, Bamyan had 21, Faryab and Ghazni had 18, Takhar had 17, Kapisa had seven, Parwan had four, Badakhshan had three, whilst Samangan recorded two new cases. Five fatalities and 22 recoveries were reported. The death toll reached 270, as the number of recoveries reached 1,450. By 1 June, 40,950 tests had been carried out.
On 1 June, the International Rescue Committee (IRC) announced that Afghanistan was facing a humanitarian disaster as the number of cases rose by 684% in May. The health ministry announced that they had the capacity to test 2,000 samples a day, despite receiving between 10,000 and 20,000 samples per day.

2 June 

 On 2 June, 758 new positive cases were announced from 1,323 tests, bringing the total to 17,267. Kabul had 332, Herat had 216, Kandahar had 54, Balkh had 52, whilst eight other provinces recorded less than 50 new cases. 78 recoveries and 24 fatalities were recorded. The death toll reached 270, as the number of recoveries reached 1,450. By 2 June, 42,273 tests had been carried out.

3 June 

 In Kunduz Province, local officials announced that Fahim Qarluq, the district governor of Qalay-i-Zal and the provincial police chief, General Rashid Bashir, had died of COVID-19.
 Ariana News reported that government officials were not following social distancing guidelines during meetings. They also reported that only some fatalities were officially recorded, as some COVID-19 positive and suspicious deaths were not reported.
 On 3 June, the Afghanistan Chamber of Commerce and Investment (ACCI) announced that there was a decline in exports to other countries trade routes with neighboring countries had been closed.
On 3 June, 13 doctors resigned from the "Covid-1" hospital in Herat that was treating more than 100 COVID-19 patients.

4 June 

 On 4 June, Ahmad Jawad Osmani announced reforms in the health sector.
570 health workers had been infected in Herat Province.
By 4 June, Reporters Without Borders (RSF) announced that 70 Afghan media employees had tested positive.

16 June 

 On 16 June, testing stopped in Herat and Balkh due to a lack of equipment. In Kabul, health workers said that 22 mobile testing centers were facing a lack of kits. Private hospitals began charging for tests and sent samples to government laboratories.

19 June 

 On 19 June, in order to rescue for Afghan citizens, the Government of Afghanistan re-opened its border with Iran, which had been closed briefly to all air and ground travel.
It was announced that all Afghan schools and universities will remain closed until September. 
Aviation and ground transportation, travel and borders to other countries, would also remain closed until the decrease of COVID-19 cases.

20 June 

 On 20 June, Pakistan's Ministry of Interior announced that the Torkham and Spin Boldak borders would open for six days a week under strict health measures.

22 June 

 On 22 June, Pakistan opened its border crossings, allowing exports for the first time in three months.
 On 22 June, it was reported that 40 of the 314 ventilators in Afghan public hospitals were not functional.
 On 22 June, Pajhwok Afghan News announced that 32 ventilators were smuggled to Pakistan. The smugglers announced that the operation was assisted by part of the Afghan health ministry. The health ministry rejected the reports.

24 June 

 On 24 June, Afghanistan resumed international air travel.

26 June 

 On 26 June, Afghan actor Faqir Nabi, died of COVID-19 in a hospital in Kabul.

28 June 

 On 28 June, patients at government hospitals claimed a shortage of oxygen, which was rejected by officials.
 Despite the lockdown, Fahim Anwari continued training for the 2020 Summer Olympics at Qargha Lake in Kabul.

July 2020

2 July 

 On 2 July, it was announced that Moby Media Group and Bayat Group had reported cases of COVID-19 among its employees. In Baghlan Province, a radio station stopped broadcasting because their editors had tested positive. Radio Nasim, a private FM radio station, struggled to air its programs. Many reporters lost their jobs during the pandemic. Ten media outlets, including TOLOnews and Ariana News, appealed to the Afghan government for help. Fewer ads resulted in falling revenues.

3 July 

 On 3 July, Afghan President Ashraf Ghani's special envoy on economic and trade development, Mohammad Yousef Ghazanfar, died from COVID-19 making him the most senior Afghan official known to have died from the disease.

15 July 

 On 15 July, Pakistan allowed Afghan exports to India through the Wagah border, after taking COVID-19 measures.

17 July 

 On 17 July, China applauded the resumption of trade relations between Afghanistan and Pakistan after five land crossings had opened. The five land crossings were Torkham, Chaman, Ghulam Khan, Angur Ada and Dand-e-Patan.

31 July 

 On 31 July 2020, the Special Inspector General for Afghanistan Reconstruction said that an additional eight million Afghans will fall into poverty due to the pandemic, exacerbating the poverty rate from 55 percent to 80 percent. This increase will likely overwhelm the country's medical care system and cause food shortages according to the report.

August 2020

2 August 

 On 2 August, one case was confirmed from 19 tests. Officials said a lower number of people were tested during Eid al-Adha. The number of total cases was 36,710. The death toll reached 1,284, as the total recoveries reached 25,509.

5 August 

 On 5 August, an official survey conducted in Afghanistan reported that approximately a third of the country's population, or roughly 10 million people had contracted COVID-19. The Ministry of Public Health announced that the survey was based on antibody tests with technical support from the World Health Organisation. 11,500 people from all 34 provinces participated in the survey.

22 August 

 On 22 August, all schools were reopened in Afghanistan.

September 2020

19 September 

 On 19 September, Ahmad Jawad Osmani, the Acting Minister of Public Health, said that the Ministry of Health has got enough financial resources to tackle a second wave of infections, after visiting Herat.

October 2020

13 October 

 On 13 October, Abdul Hakim Tamanna, Head of the Herat Health Department, reported that 156 students and teachers in Herat Province had tested positive in the past week from 386 tests. He said that 35 to 60 students learn in a single room due to a lack of facilities and the failure to heed social distancing guidelines.

21 October 

 On 21 October 2020, at least 12 people were killed during a rampage at the soccer stadium in eastern Afghanistan. Around 10,000 people were at the stadium waiting for token that could enable them to apply for the visa to Pakistan. Many of the applicants were seeking visa for medical care. The incident came after the Pakistani Consulate in Jalalabad resumed operations after being closed for 8 months due to COVID-19 travel restrictions.

November 2020

29 November 

 On 29 November, Public Health Acting Minister Jawad Osmani warned of a second wave of COVID-19 infections in Afghanistan. Osmani stated that around 1240 people had been infected within the past week. The infections had increased by 10 percent and the fatalities had increased by 3 percent.

December 2020

19 December 

 According to the Public Health Ministry, as of 19 December there has been a total of 50,536 cases in the country. Of those, a third were in Kabul. However, due to the lack of easily-accessible testing facilities, the Ministry estimated the actual number of positive cases to be much higher.

January 2021

4 January
 On 4 January 2021, the health ministry called on the public to limit their travels over the next four weeks to contain a possible movement of the mutated version of the virus to Afghanistan.

18–20 January 
 Between 18 and 20 January 2021, India announced it would supply COVID-19 vaccines to Afghanistan. India said that exports to Afghanistan were awaiting "necessary regulatory clearances".

25 January 
 On 25 January 2021, Tahir Qadiry announced that 500,000 vaccines would be given to Afghanistan from India.

27 January 
 On 27 January 2021, it was announced that Afghanistan received $112 million from the World Health Organization's COVAX program, which covers 20 per cent of the population.

February 2021

7 February 
 On 7 February 2021, the Government of Afghanistan announced plans to vaccinate 60 percent of the population as the first 500,000 doses of COVID-19 vaccine arrived in Kabul from India. 150,000 health workers will be vaccinated first, followed by adults with health problems.

23 February 
 On 23 February 2021, Afghanistan officially launched its coronavirus vaccination program at the Arg.

March 2021

1 March 
 By 1 March 2021, at least 8,200 health workers had been vaccinated against COVID-19 in Afghanistan.

8 March 

 On 8 March 2021, Afghanistan received 468,000 COVID-19 vaccine doses from COVAX.

30 March 

On 30 March 2021, seven people were infected with a coronavirus variant.

April 2021

7 April 

By 7 April 2021, 100,000 people in Afghanistan had received their COVID-19 vaccination.

May 2021 
In May, Afghanistan entered the third wave of the COVID-19 pandemic.

June 2021 
On 12 June, UNAMA announced that an additional 468,000 doses of the AstraZeneca will be provided to Afghanistan.

July 2021 
UNDARK reported that the Afghanistan conflict "hindered the country’s Covid response", especially in Kandahar.

August 2021 
According to a report by Shamshad News, the Taliban banned use of COVID-19 vaccines in the Paktia regional hospital.

Following the Fall of Kabul on 15 August (marking the collapse of the previous government of Afghanistan) the WHO and medical experts feared a potential "rapid and uncontrolled spread of COVID-19". The week after the fall of Kabul, COVID-19 tests decreased by 77% and COVID-19 vaccinations decreased by 80% compared to the week before.

September 2021 
On 3 September, Suhail Shaheen, a spokesman for the Taliban, stated that China will "increase its humanitarian assistance, especially for treatment of COVID-19".

October 2021 
Starting from 9 October, Taliban officials and United States of America representatives held talks in Doha, Qatar. Afghanistan's acting foreign minister  Mullah Amir Khan Muttaqi stated that the Afghan delegation focused on humanitarian aid and that the US would offer COVID-19 vaccines to the Afghan people.

As of 30 October, nearly 40,000 people in Afghanistan received COVID-19 vaccines per day.

Chinese foreign minister Wang Yi urged the World Health Organization to give more vaccines and medical supplies to aid Afghanistan in fighting COVID-19.

November 2021 
The United Nations Development Programme, with an agreement with The Global Fund to Fight AIDS, Tuberculosis and Malaria, has provided $15 million to prevent the collapse of Afghanistan's health system, paying for medicines, health supplies, and healthcare workers' salaries.

December 2021 
On 3 December, the "Ministry of Public Health (MoPH)" stated that there were no cases of the SARS-CoV-2 Omicron variant so far in Afghanistan, but urged international assistance.

On 8 December, about 800,000 doses of COVID-19 vaccine arrived in Afghanistan, with 200,000 to arrivethe next day. Wang Yu also said that China has "announced another three million doses of vaccine to Afghanistan". Abdul Bari Omar, the Afghan deputy minister of health services, also said that pregnant women and children could take COVID-19 vaccines.

On 11 December, India sent "1.6 metric tonne of life-saving medicines" to Afghanistan, the first assistance it gave since the fall of Kabul. India made a commitment to provide the Afghan people "50,000 MT of wheat, essential lifesaving medicines and COVID-19 vaccines".

On 16 December, the Associated Press reported that the "Afghan-Japan hospital for communicable diseases", the only hospital to treat COVID-19 for people in Kabul, had run out of resources such as diesel fuel (to produce oxygen for patients), drug supplies, and examination gloves.

January 2022 
On 11 January, the White House announced that it was providing Afghanistan with a million additional doses of COVID-19 vaccines through COVAX.

February 2022 
Almost half of the 8,496 samples that public laboratories in Afghanistan tested between 30 January and 5 February tested positive for COVID-19, for a 47.4% positivity rate. With 33 other hospitals in Afghanistan having closed, only 5 hospitals there still offered treatment for COVID-19. About 27% of Afghanistan's people had been vaccinated, most with the single-dose Johnson & Johnson vaccine.

See also 
 COVID-19 pandemic in Afghanistan
 Timeline of the COVID-19 pandemic
 COVID-19 pandemic in Asia
 COVID-19 pandemic in South Asia

References 

COVID-19 pandemic in Afghanistan
Afghanistan